Sébastien Izambard (born 7 March 1973) is a French singer, composer and record producer. His vocal range is classified as popular melody or vox populi to a loud, so it has a tenor tessitura phonic.

He has been a member of the classical crossover group Il Divo since 2004, which has sold over 28 million copies worldwide discs.
In 2000, he launched the solo album titled Libre, reaching number No. 1 ranking with the single "Si tu savais" achieving excellent sales ranking in France, Canada and Belgium. Currently, Izambard writes, produces and composes for pop artists of international stature.

Izambard is an active member of the French organization AMTM (Assistance Médicale Toit du Monde) and global ambassador for the Sanfilippo Children's Foundation.

Early life
Izambard's childhood was hard; his parents were divorced and his father left when he was six. He grew up in a poor single parent household and lived with his mother in a room little bigger than 100sqft on the top floor of a block of apartments in Parisian Dense with her great-grandmother. He studied at the Lycée Janson de Sailly in Paris, considered one of the best schools in Europe.

As his mother worked, he grew accustomed to solitude and independence. At the age of 12, he cooked cakes as a gift for her after her workday. He confessed that for him, becoming an adult was more a way to learn to get out of trouble, as before his parents separated, he witnessed violence, drugs and abuse. Due to this psychological impact, he became a cautious, introverted and repressed child. However, with the help of child specialists, he was able to overcome this feeling of repression.

Musical career

Soloist
Izambard started his career as a pop musician in France, releasing a solo album called Libre and his song "Si Tu Savais" was ranked first in French Hit Charts. Besides being a singer, Izambard is also an accomplished music composer, pianist, and guitar player In Paris he has written music for many French artists.
In 2001, he performed with Johnny Hallyday as a guest in the Olympia Theater in Paris. His music, greatly influenced by Jeff Buckley, earns him the acknowledgement of French and Canadian audiences.

French singer Florent Pagny is his musical godfather.

Musical theatre
Izambard performed in February 2002 in Richard Cocciante's musical Le Petit Prince, where he played the role of the Business Man. He also performed in several theatre plays as part of the group La Troupe.

He was preparing his second album with Francis Madjouli and Lionel Florence when he became involved with Il Divo.

Il Divo

While recording his second solo album after collaborating on Le Petit Prince, Izambard attended an audition for the musical The Sun King. While waiting, he met Geraldine Larrosa, (Innocence) and her then-partner Carlos Marín, who spoke to him after hearing Izambard sing in online videos. Marín said it was worth a try, so Izambard went to the Bastille in Paris, where the auditions were being held by Sonny Takhar. Hearing Izambard "Caruso" performed the song while playing the piano himself, relaxed and convinced that he had nothing to lose since he thought would lead nowhere. However, Cowell heard him and offered him the job. Izambard said to himself "Je ne regrette rien (I have nothing to lose)", accepted and devoted himself in the global musical quartet Il Divo in December 2003, along with Urs Bühler (Switzerland), David Miller (US) and Carlos Marín (Spain). Izambard is the only member of the group who is not classically trained.

Izambard has said that he has two dreams while being in Il Divo: composing a song for the quartet, and singing songs in French. In fact, Ancora, the second album of the group, contains two songs in French: "Je Crois en toi" (a duet partially in French with Céline Dion) and "Pour Que Tu M'Aimes Encore." "I Believe in You" is an original song for both artists, while "Pour Que Tu M'Aimes Encore" is Dion's, considered to be her most famous song in French.

Their first album, called Il Divo became a worldwide multiplatinum selling record when released in November 2004, entering Billboard at number 4; it sold five million copies worldwide in less than a year and knocked Robbie Williams from the number one spot. Their second album, Ancora, was released on 7 November 2005 in the United Kingdom. Il Divo's third album Siempre was released on 21 November 2006 in the United States and on 27 November 2006 internationally. Their latest album, The Promise, was released on 10 November 2008 (world) & 18 November 2008 (US), and shot straight to number 1 in the United Kingdom. In 2013 they published A Musical Affair, the songs of which are inspired by famous plays and musicals.

On 9 June 2006, Il Divo performed the 2006 FIFA World Cup official song "The Time of Our Lives" with R&B singer Toni Braxton live, at half-time, during the opening match between Germany and Costa Rica and again a month later at 9 July closing ceremony. The song is available exclusively on the Voices from the FIFA World Cup compilation album and on the European reissue of Braxton's album Libra but not on any Il Divo album. 
Il Divo have been on several world tours and have received 50 gold and platinum awards. Their last tour in 2014 covered 5 continents and over 33 countries.

On 12 December 2008, Il Divo performed their new song at the Swedish Idol 2008 finale in the Globen Arena in Stockholm, Sweden.
The Paraguay show was Il Divo's biggest capacity performance to date and took place on 20 December 2011, at the Defensores del Chaco Stadium in Asuncion, for 33,900 people.

13 May 2012 Il Divo performed the song "Caruso" with a staging of riding the rhythm of the song during the Diamond Jubilee of Elizabeth II at Windsor for the entire royal family and Queen Elizabeth II of the United Kingdom.

On 6 September 2012, it was announced that Il Divo would release a Greatest Hits album. The album was produced by Alberto Quintero and featured songs spanning Il Divo's successful eight-year career to date, as well as four new songs including "My Heart Will Go On", "I Will Always Love You", "Can't Help Falling in Love" and "Alone".

On 19 July 2014, Il Divo performed before a capacity crowd at Edinburgh Castle esplanade where a pop festival took place ahead of the 2014 Commonwealth Games. The group performed "Amazing Grace".

On 23 March 2015, it was announced that Il Divo was the winner of the 2015 Silver Clef Award, giving them the coveted Classic PPL. The gala award ceremony took place on 3 July at the Grosvenor House Hotel, a five-star hotel in London.

Record producer and composer
Izambard says that composing and writing songs is his passion, writing for the pleasure of writing. Before joining Il Divo, he wrote and produced songs for other French artists.

In parallel with Il Divo, Izambard continued writing songs with pop stars in the world; as with Australian Darren Hayes, the lead singer of Savage Garden; the star of The Phantom of the Opera Ramin Karimloo; Guy Chambers; and with the lyricist Don Black.

In November 2014, Izambard led the project to create an album with different Australian artists for raising money. Izambard, with the help of Sony Pictures Entertainment, produced along with the Spanish producer Alberto Quintero, producer as well of some of the albums of IL Divo, the album titled For Bringing Hope Isla and Jude, which was released on 5 December 2014 with the single written by Kate Bush "This Woman's Work", for St. Filippo Foundation.

Duets and collaborations

Izambard has made many music & duets collaborations with major artists, both alone and with a member of Il Divo.

Philanthropy
Izambard is an active member of two charities: the French organization AMTM (Assistance Médicale Toit du Monde) which helps poor children in Nepal and India, where during one of his campaigns to raise funds in September 2008, Seb raffled off several of his Armani suits, and the Australian Sanfilippo Children's Foundation organization, of which he is global ambassador.

He recorded two videoclips and collaborated in solidarity projects such as the Noël Ensemble, a record in which more than one hundred artists participated in order to raise funds for the fight against AIDS.

Personal life
Izambard became engaged to Australian Renée Murphy on 1 June 2007 and they married 17 August 2008 in France.
Renée was a publicist for Sony BMG when she met Izambard in Australia in 2005, who was on a tour with the group.

A few months before the wedding, on 20 March 2008, Sebastien and Renée became parents of twins, Rose and Luca, who were born in Port-Royal, a famous maternity in Paris. On 20 May 2011, the couple's third child, a son, Jude was born.

On 11 September 2018, Murphy began divorce proceedings at the Stanley Mosk Courthouse in Los Angeles. In a Bolivian interview on 29 May 2019, he confirmed he had a new girlfriend.

Discography

Singer

Solo
Studio albums
2000 – Libre

2018 – We Came Here to Love
2022 – FROM SEB WITH LOVE

Il Divo

Studio albums  
2004 – Il Divo 
2005 – Ancora
2006 – Siempre
2008 – The Promise 
2011 – Wicked Game 
2013 – A Musical Affair
2015 – Amor & Pasión
2018 – Timeless
Seasonal album 
2005 – The Christmas Collection
Albums Collections  
2012 -  The Greatest Hits
Live albums
2009 – An Evening with Il Divo: Live in Barcelona
2014 – Live in Japan
2016 – Live in Japan 2016

Collaborations other albums
 2000 – Nöel Ensemble
 2005 – On ne change pas; Celine Dion (Il Divo)
 2006 – Voices from the FIFA World Cup (Il Divo)
 2006 – Libra; Toni Braxton (Il Divo)
 2014 – Engelbert Calling; Engelbert Humperdick, song "Spanish Eyes". (Il Divo)
2015 – Los Dúos; Juan Gabriel song "Amor eterno" (Il Divo)

Musical theater
 2002 – Le Petit Prince, (Studio version)  
 2002 – Le Petit Prince, (Full version)

Producer
2014 – Hope – This Woman's Work

Composer
2010 – Ramin de Ramin Karimloo
2011 – Secret Codes and Battleships de Darren Hayes

Videography

Soloist
Official video
 2004 – Libre

Musical works
Musical
 2002 – Le Petit Prince

Il Divo

Documentary / Concert
 2004 – Live at Gotham Hall  
 2005 – Encore 
 2005 – Mamá  
 2006 – The Yule Log: The Christmas Collection 
 2006 – Live At the Greek Theater  
 2008 – At the Coliseum 
 2009 – An Evening with Il Divo: Live in Barcelona  
 2011 – Live in London
 2014 – Live in Japan
 2016 – Live in Japan 2016

Official video
 2004 – Regresa a mí
 2005 – Mama
 2006 – Time of our Lives.
 2014 – Le Temps Des Cathédrales
 2014 – Who Wants to Live Forever
 2014 – Aimer
 2014 – Can You Feel the Love Tonight
 2014 – Memory
 2015 - Amor & Pasión -Trailer-

References

External links

 Official website Sébastien Izambard
 Official website Il Divo

1973 births
Living people
French male singers
21st-century French male pianists
French pop singers
Musicians from Paris
French pop guitarists
French male guitarists
French tenors
Male actors from Paris
French composers
French record producers
Il Divo members